Hiroshi Izumi ( born June 22, 1982 in Shimokita District Aomori) is a Japanese judoka and mixed martial artist. He has fought in World Victory Road and had a one-fight stint in the Dream promotion for the Dream Light Heavyweight Championship. Izumi also appeared in both Dynamite!! 2009 and Dynamite!! 2010 New Year's Eve events.

Background
Izumi, was born in Aomori, Japan and comes from a fishing family in the Shimokita Peninsula. His father, who can often be seen spectating his son's judo and MMA matches, still fishes for bluefin tuna at over 70 years of age. Izumi began judo at a young age and is known as a very accomplished judoka, winning the men's -90 kg category silver medal at the Athens Olympics in 2004 and the gold medal at the World Judo Championship Games in Cairo, Egypt in 2005.

Mixed Martial Arts
Izumi made his mixed martial arts debut against New Zealand kickboxing specialist, Antz Nansen for Japan's Sengoku promotion in September 2009 after Izumi signed with World Victory Road. Instead of using his judo techniques to his advantage during his debut, Izumi attempted to trade punches with the world-class striker. Izumi was beaten badly in his debut and lost the fight by TKO.

After his poor performance in his debut, Izumi began turning his mixed martial arts career around. At Dynamite!! 2009, representing Sengoku, he won via unanimous decision over Katsuyori Shibata. After being dominated through the first few rounds, Izumi came back in the second half of the very final round, landing a great sequence of punches and controlling Shibata on the ground, where he utilized many hammerfists. This win was very significant because Izumi's father was vocal in saying that if Izumi was defeated again, that he would take his son out of MMA and return to judo.

Izumi followed this win up with 3 more wins, including one at Dynamite!! 2010, against former PRIDE veteran and Dream Super Hulk Tournament Champion Ikuhisa Minowa by TKO. This is perhaps the biggest win of Izumi's career to date.

Izumi then earned a title shot at Gegard Mousasi for the Dream Light Heavyweight Championship, but lost by TKO.

Mixed martial arts record

|-
| Loss
| align=center| 4-2
| Gegard Mousasi
| TKO (punches)
| Dream: Japan GP Final
| 
| align=center| 1
| align=center| 3:28
| Tokyo, Japan
| For Dream Light Heavyweight Championship
|-
| Win
| align=center| 4-1
| Ikuhisa Minowa
| TKO (punches)
| Dynamite!! 2010
| 
| align=center| 3
| align=center| 2:50
| Saitama, Saitama, Japan
| Openweight bout
|-
| Win
| align=center| 3-1
| James Zikic
| Decision (split)
| World Victory Road Presents: Sengoku Raiden Championships 15
| 
| align=center| 3
| align=center| 5:00
| Tokyo, Japan
| 
|-
| Win
| align=center| 2-1
| Chang Seob Lee
| TKO (punches)
| World Victory Road Presents: Sengoku Raiden Championships 13
| 
| align=center| 1
| align=center| 4:37
| Tokyo, Japan
| 
|-
| Win
| align=center| 1-1
| Katsuyori Shibata
| Decision (unanimous)
| Dynamite!! 2009
| 
| align=center| 3
| align=center| 5:00
| Saitama, Saitama, Japan
| 
|-
| Loss
| align=center| 0-1
| Antz Nansen
| TKO (punches)
| World Victory Road Presents: Sengoku 10
| 
| align=center| 1
| align=center| 2:56
| Saitama, Saitama, Japan
|

References

External links
 
 

1982 births
Living people
Japanese male judoka
Judoka at the 2004 Summer Olympics
Judoka at the 2008 Summer Olympics
Olympic judoka of Japan
Olympic silver medalists for Japan
Sportspeople from Aomori Prefecture
Japanese male mixed martial artists
Light heavyweight mixed martial artists
Heavyweight mixed martial artists
Mixed martial artists utilizing judo
Olympic medalists in judo
World judo champions
Medalists at the 2004 Summer Olympics
Asian Games medalists in judo
Judoka at the 2006 Asian Games
Asian Games bronze medalists for Japan
Medalists at the 2006 Asian Games
Universiade medalists in judo
Universiade gold medalists for Japan
Medalists at the 2003 Summer Universiade